The Queensland Railways 6D11½ class locomotive was a class of 0-6-0ST steam locomotive operated by the Queensland Railways.

History
In January 1903, two Beyer, Peacock & Company built crane locomotives entered service. Per Queensland Railway's classification system they were designated the 6D11½ class, the 6 representing the number of driving wheels, the D that it was a tank locomotive, and the 11½ the cylinder diameter in inches. There delivery was delayed after the ship Duke of Sutherland they were aboard ran aground off Lizard Island. Both had their cranes removed in 1911/12.

Class list

References

Beyer, Peacock locomotives
Railway locomotives introduced in 1903
6D11
0-6-0ST locomotives
3 ft 6 in gauge locomotives of Australia